Diana Der Hovanessian (May 21, Year of birth unknown– March 1, 2018), Armenian American poet, translator, and author. Much of the subject of her poetry was about Armenia and the Armenian diaspora. She wrote and published over twenty-five books.

Life and career
Diana Der Hovanessian was born in Worcester, Massachusetts, to an Armenian family. She received her education at Boston University, majoring in English, and then continued her education at Harvard University, studying under Robert Lowell.
She became an American literature professor at Yerevan State University, and twice a Fulbright Professor of Armenian Poetry.  She led many workshops including Boston University, Bard College, and Columbia University, as well as being a visiting poet and lecturer on American poetry, Armenian poetry in translation. and the literature of human rights in the United States and abroad. For over thirty years she served as the president of the New England Poetry Club, and was on the translation board of Columbia University. She worked as a poet in the Massachusetts schools.

Three volumes of her poetry were translated into Armenian and published in Yerevan. Her works were also translated into Greek, French and Romanian. Der Hovanessian's poems have appeared in The New York Times, The Christian Science Monitor, The Boston Globe, Paris Review, the Writer's Almanac, AGNI, The American Poetry Review, and The Nation, among many others.

Awards
Diana Der Hovanessian's awards include:

Gold Medal from the Minister of Culture of Armenia
Mesrob Mashtots Translation Award (2003)
Armenian National Library Medal
Armenian Writers Union Award
The PEN-New England GOLDEN PEN Award
The National Writers Union Award
National Endowment for the Arts award (1993)
St. Sahag Medal
Paterson Prize
International Poetry Forum publication prize
QRL Colladay publication prize
Awards from American Scholar and Prairie Schooner
PEN/Columbia Translation Award
Anahid Award from the Columbia University Armenian Center
The Barcelona Peace Prize
Armand Erpf translation prize
Boston University Distinguished Alumni Award
Mary Caroline Davies Poetry Society of America Lyric Poem Award
New England Poetry Club Gretchen Warren Award
Numerous prizes from the World Order of Narrative Poets

Her poetry has been translated into Armenian, Greek, French and Romanian.

Partial bibliography

How to choose your past (1978)
 
Come sit beside me and listen to Kouchag: Medieval Poems of Nahabed Kouchag (1984)
About time: poems (1987)
Songs of bread, songs of salt (1990) 
Selected Poems (1994)
The Circle Dancers (1996)
Any Day Now : poems (1999)
The Burning Glass : poems (2002) 
The Other Voice: Armenian Women's Poetry Through the Ages (2005)
The Second Question : poems (2007)
Dancing at the monastery : poems (2011)

References

External links
 "I write almost every day" (Interview with Der Hovanessian)

1934 births
2018 deaths
Writers from Worcester, Massachusetts
Armenian women poets
American people of Armenian descent
Armenian educators
Boston University College of Arts and Sciences alumni
Harvard University alumni
Academic staff of Yerevan State University
Armenian-language women poets
Armenian-language poets
21st-century Armenian women writers
21st-century Armenian writers
20th-century Armenian women writers
20th-century Armenian writers